The Carlton Hotel in Christchurch was an historic pub on the corner of Papanui Road and Bealey Avenue. Built in 1906 for the New Zealand International Exhibition, it was registered by the New Zealand Historic Places Trust as a Category II heritage building. The building was damaged in the February 2011 Christchurch earthquake and demolished on 9 April 2011.

History
Papanui Road, linking to Main North Road, was the traditional route for travellers from the north. Cobb & Co travelled north via Victoria Street and Papanui Road, and one of the first tram routes in Christchurch was built along this corridor.

The first hotel was built on the site in 1865, only 15 years after the organised settlement of Christchurch began by the Canterbury Association. Ward's Brewery commissioned architect Joseph Maddison to design a new hotel, to be opened in time for the International Exhibition that was held in Christchurch's Hagley Park from November 1906 to April 1907. Maddison also designed the buildings for the International Exhibition, which attracted nearly two million visitors at a time when New Zealand's population was only one million.

The Carlton Hotel was the first place in New Zealand to serve beer on tap in 1939–1940, and it had the country's first beer garden in 1947. It opened New Zealand's first drive through bottle store in 1954. Burger King opened a fast food restaurant in September 1999 and took up much of the ground floor of the building.

Carlton Hotel suffered damage in the 2010 Canterbury earthquake, but remained open. It was heavily damaged in the subsequent earthquake on 22 February 2011, when part of the façade facing Papanui Road collapsed. Engineers found that the building was prone to failure in another strong aftershock, and it was demolished on 9 April 2011. The building's owner has replaced the building with a modern structure, but the new complex has been criticised as "unsympathetic".

Heritage listing

On 26 November 1981, the building was registered by the New Zealand Historic Places Trust as a Category II historic place, with the registration number 1841. The building is recognised as an example of Maddison's work, who designed many hotel. It is located on a busy junction and regarded as a landmark. Due to several New Zealand firsts, it is an important part of the country's brewing industry. Its link to the International Exhibition is also of importance.

The building was removed from the register during 2011.

References

Hotel buildings completed in 1906
Heritage New Zealand Category 2 historic places in Canterbury, New Zealand
World's fair architecture in New Zealand
Buildings and structures demolished as a result of the 2011 Christchurch earthquake
1900s architecture in New Zealand
Hotels in Christchurch
1906 establishments in New Zealand